Pritchard & Nickles was an architecture firm based in Tunica, Mississippi. The firm designed both county Panola County, Mississippi courthouse in Batesville, Mississippi and Sardis, Mississippi. The firm has also designed churches, schools, commercial buildings and residences in Mississippi and Arkansas. One of the firm's larger projects was the design of the School of Commerce at the University of Mississippi.

The partnership includes John H. Pritchard, a graduate of Georgia Tech. He is 
a Fellow of the American Institute of Architects and was president of the Mississippi chapter of the American Institute of Architects. He served in the U.S. Army in civil affairs was chief of the operations division of the Office of War Information. He was also once the chief architect for the National Youth Administration in Washington.

Works
Panola County Courthouse in Batesville, Mississippi (1967)
Panola County Courthouse in Sardis Mississippi (1974)

References

Architecture firms based in Mississippi